Polessk is a former airbase of the Soviet Air Forces located near Polessk, Kaliningrad Oblast, Russia.

The base was home to the:
 335th Assault Aviation Division between 1945 and 1946
 60th Fighter Aviation Division between 1957 and 1960
 211th Fighter Aviation Regiment between 1957 and 1960 with the Mikoyan-Gurevich MiG-17 (ASCC: Fresco)
 938th Fighter Aviation Regiment between 1957 and 1960 with the MiG-17
 939th Fighter Aviation Regiment between 1957 and 1960 with the MiG-17

References

Soviet Air Force bases